Songyun (Manchu:  sungyūn; ; 1752–1835) was a military governor during the Qing dynasty of Imperial China, from 1802 to 1809.

He was an amban of Xinjiang, Guangdong, and Tibet.

In Xinjiang, he was responsible for the compilation of a gazetteer of the area, using the services of officials exiled to the frontier area, including Wang Tingkai, Qi Yunshi and Xu Song.

References 

Qing dynasty writers
Chinese travel writers
Qing dynasty politicians
19th-century Chinese people
1752 births
1835 deaths
Political office-holders in Xinjiang
Political office-holders in Guangdong
Political office-holders in Tibet
Chinese people of Mongolian descent
Grand Councillors of the Qing dynasty
Grand Secretaries of the Qing dynasty
Assistant Grand Secretaries
Viceroys of Shaan-Gan
Viceroys of Southern Rivers
Viceroys of Zhili
Viceroys of Liangjiang
Viceroys of Liangguang
Mongolian Plain Blue Bannermen